The 2009–10 Nemzeti Bajnokság I was the fifty-ninth series of the national team handball championship for Hungarian women. Győri ETO KC were the defending champions and they retained the championship by going undefeated throughout the season. The competition began on 2 September 2009, and ended on 27 March 2010. The playoffs ended on 15 May, with Váci NKSE beating Békéscsabai ENKSE thus taking the bronze medal.

Overview

Teams

Vasas SC and PTE-PEAC were relegated to the 2009–10 Nemzeti Bajnokság I/B after finishing the 2008–09 season in the bottom two places. 1982 European Champions Cup winners, Vasas SC, ended a forty-two-year spell in the top division, having played in the Nemzeti Bajnokság I since 1967. Newcomers PTE-PEAC, the handball team of the University of Pécs, suffered relegation after just one season.

Despite ranking seventh in the last year's championship, Tajtavill-Nyíradony had to leave the competition, after they lost many of their sponsors and faced serious financial trouble. Team president János Tajta, who spent about 200–300 million Hungarian forint (about 1 million Euro) on the team during his five-year ownership, announced on 8 July 2010, that the club was finished and withdrew from all competitions.

The three teams were replaced by newly promoted Hunnia KSK, Veszprém Barabás KC and Siófok KC.

The league comprised two teams from Budapest (Ferencvárosi TC, Hunnia KSK), three clubs from Central Transdanubia (Alcoa Fehérvár KC, Dunaújvárosi NKKSE and Veszprém Barabás KC), three teams from the Southern Great Plain (ASA-Consolis Hódmezővásárely, Kiskunhalas NKSE-Bravotel and Mondi Békéscsabai ENKSE); and one each from Western Transdanubia (Győri Audi ETO KC), Southern Transdanubia (Siófok KC), Central Hungary (Váci NKSE) and the Northern Great Plain (DVSC-Korvex).

In the regular season, the sides played twice against each other side, on a home leg and an away leg. The top four teams qualified for the playoffs, in which a best-of-three system was used. Teams ranked fifth to ninth, and tenth to twelfth, decided their final rank in a classification round, using a round robin system, playing six additional rounds. They were also awarded bonus points according their final position in the regular season.

League champions and runners-up enter the 2010–2011 EHF Champions League, while the next two teams following them have the right to take part in the 2010–11 EHF Cup. The bottom two clubs get relegated.

Arenas and locations

Regular season

Results

League table

Individual statistics

Top scorers

Worst disciplines

Team statistics

Overall
Most wins – Győri Audi ETO KC (22)
Fewest wins – Kiskunhalas NKSE-Bravotel and Hunnia KSK (1)
Most losses – Kiskunhalas NKSE-Bravotel and Hunnia KSK (21) 
Fewest losses – Győri Audi ETO KC (0) 
Most goals scored – Váci NKSE (787) 
Fewest goals scored – Hunnia KSK (459) 
Most goals conceded – Hunnia KSK (922) 
Fewest goals conceded – Győri Audi ETO KC (517) 
Best goal difference – Győri Audi ETO KC (+249) 
Worst goal difference – Hunnia KSK (−463)

Home
Most wins – Győri Audi ETO KC (11)
Fewest wins – Kiskunhalas NKSE-Bravotel and Hunnia KSK (1)
Most losses – Kiskunhalas NKSE-Bravotel and Hunnia KSK (10)
Fewest losses – Győri Audi ETO KC (0)
Most goals scored – Váci NKSE (425)
Fewest goals scored – Hunnia KSK (240)
Most goals conceded – Hunnia KSK (451)
Fewest goals conceded – Mondi Békéscsabai ENKSE (232)

Away
Most wins – Győri Audi ETO KC (11)
Fewest wins – Hunnia KSK and Kiskunhalas NKSE-Bravotel (0)
Most losses – Hunnia KSK and Kiskunhalas NKSE-Bravotel (11)
Fewest losses – Győri Audi ETO KC (0)
Most goals scored – Győri Audi ETO KC (371)
Fewest goals scored – Hunnia KSK (219)
Most goals conceded – Hunnia KSK (471)
Fewest goals conceded – Mondi Békéscsabai ENKSE (273)

Scoring
Widest winning margin: 41 goals –
Hunnia KSK 16–57 Váci NKSE (16 January 2010)
Győri Audi ETO KC 60–19 Hunnia KSK (27 March 2010)
Most goals in a match: 81 goals – Váci NKSE 54–27 Siófok KC (3 January 2010)
Fewest goals in a match: 35 goals – Alcoa Fehérvár KC 14–21 Mondi Békéscsabai ENKSE (30 January 2010)
Most goals scored by losing team: 37 goals – Dunaújvárosi NKKSE 37–39 Váci NKSE (5 February 2010)
Most goals scored in a match by one player: 16 goals
Zita Szucsánszki for Ferencvárosi TC against ASA-Consolis HNKC (16 January 2010)
Viktória Koroknai for ASA-Consolis HNKC against Alcoa Fehérvár KC (13 March 2010)

Postseason
The postseason was officially called Arany Ászok Rájátszás, after brewing company SABMiller bought the naming rights and changed its name to promote the Arany Ászok beer. The playoffs started on 10 April 2010 and ran until 15 May 2010.

Classification round 9–12
Bottom four teams after the regular season entered a classification round, in which they tried to avoid relegation. The sides faced each other in a double round robin system and were given additional points according to their final position in the regular season. Ninth placed Veszprém Barabás KC got four points, tenth placed Hódmezővásárhely were awarded three, Kiskunhalas took two points and even last placed Hunnia KSK were given one point.

Results

Table

Additional points that were awarded after the final positions in the regular season (minus any point deductions) are indicated in the bonus points column.

Classification round 5–8
Teams ranked between fifth and eighth place, after the first part of the season, were drawn into another group. Similar to the classification round for 9–12 places, clubs were rewarded with bonus points depending on their position in the regular season.

Results

Table

Additional points that were awarded after the final positions in the regular season are indicated in bonus points column.

Championship playoff
The top four teams of the regular season continued the battle for the title in a best-of-three playoff system, in which if a match ends with a draw, the winner is decided by penalty shootout. Top ranked Győr met with Békéscsaba, while Vác enjoyed home court advantage over DVSC, after topping the Debrecen-based club by one point in the regular season.

Bracket

Semifinals

Győri Audi ETO KC vs. Mondi Békéscsabai ENKSE

Győri Audi ETO KC won series 2–0

DVSC-Korvex vs. Váci NKSE

DVSC-Korvex won series 2–0

Third place playoffs

Váci NKSE won series 2–1

Finals

Győri Audi ETO KC won series 2–0

Final standing

References

External links
 Worldhandball – IT help
 Hungarian Handball Federation official website

Net
Net
Handball leagues in Hungary
Hungary
2009 in women's handball
2010 in women's handball